Heretic  is the third novel in The Grail Quest series by English author Bernard Cornwell, first published in 2003. Set during the first stage of the Hundred Years' War, the novel follows Thomas of Hookton's quest to find the Holy Grail, a relic which may grant decisive victory to the possessor.

Plot summary

Heretic begins with a bloody battle outside Calais in 1347, a short time before the city fell to the English. The sympathetic Thomas of Hookton is bending every sinew at the service of his master, the Earl of Northampton; after risking his life time and again, Thomas finds himself commissioned to track down the most sacred relic in Christendom, the Holy Grail. He travels to Gascony, seat of power of his nemesis, Guy Vexille. With his cunning, Thomas is able to take control of a fictional fortress town and there meets Genevieve, a local woman about to be burned at the stake for witchcraft. Thomas saves her, however the action costs him dearly for he is later excommunicated. As he realises he is losing respect and approval amongst his men, Thomas is forced to abandon the fastness and begins journeying through Gascony with Genevieve. Rejoining with his band of archers later in the plot, Thomas conducts a fierce guerrilla war against Vexille, and yearns for a face-to-face encounter. But then Thomas is routed and finds his campaign in shreds, facing the twin enemies of the church and the plague.

Characters
 Thomas of Hookton - protagonist, illegitimate son of a priest, archer in the English army
 Robbie Douglas - Captured Scottish noble, Thomas' friend
 Guy Vexille, Comte d'Astarac - Thomas's cousin, his father's murderer and the antagonist
 Sir Guillaume d'Evecque - French knight who fights for Thomas, also father of Thomas' previous lover Eleanor
 William Bohun - English commander and Thomas' boss.
 Sir William Douglas - Uncle of Robbie Douglas
 Sir Thomas Dagworth - English military leader in Brittany
 Cardinal Louis Bessières - Corrupt French Cardinal and Papal Legate to the French court, who aspires to become Pope
 Charles Bessières - Louis's younger brother, a mercenary leader
 Genevieve - a French woman suspected of witchcraft and later Thomas's lover.

References

Thomas of Hookton novels
2003 British novels
Fiction set in the 1340s
Novels set in the 14th century
HarperCollins books